Peter Luo Xuegang (born 20 February 1964) is a Chinese Catholic priest and Bishop of the Roman Catholic Diocese of Suifu since 2012. He is a member of the Catholic Patriotic Association.

Biography
Luo was born in Renshou County, Sichuan, on February 20, 1964, to a Catholic  family. In April 1984 he entered the Sichuan Catholic Theological and Philosophical College, where he graduated in December 1988. Then he was accepted to the Shanghai Sheshan Monastery. From March to December 2004 he studied at the National Seminary of Catholic Church in China.

He was ordained a priest on November 30, 1991. Then he was assigned to the Roman Catholic Diocese of Leshan.

He accepted the episcopacy with the papal mandate on November 30, 2011. On December 16, 2012, after the death of his predecessor John Chen Shi-zhong, he became bishop of Suifu.

References

1964 births
Sichuanese Roman Catholics
People from Meishan
Living people
National Seminary of Catholic Church in China alumni
21st-century Roman Catholic bishops in China
Bishops of the Catholic Patriotic Association